Paraptenodytes brodkorbi is a proposed, but possibly invalid, species of extinct penguin in the genus Paraptenodytes. The bird was probably about the size of a king penguin. Known material is limited to a single humerus, Early Miocene in age, found in the Monte León Formation near Puerto San Julián in Santa Cruz Province, Argentina. It exists as an unnumbered specimen in the collection of the Museo Argentino de Ciencias Naturales.

Description 
This taxon is the product of a nomenclatorial dispute. Florentino Ameghino in 1905 described some penguin bones which he thought to be specifically distinct as Isotremornis nordenskjöldi: a tarsometatarsus, a humerus, and a part of a femur. Subsequently, the tarsometatarsus and the femur piece turned out to be from Paraptenodytes antarcticus. George Gaylord Simpson (1946) and Pierce Brodkorb (1963) argued about whether the bones could all be considered syntypes or whether only the wrongly assigned tarsometatarsus was designated as the holotype. Brodkorb argued for the latter, and Simpson "reluctantly" agreed; Isotremornis nordenskjöldi became a junior synonym of P. antarcticus. Thus, another name had to be given - and added to the already long and confusing list of valid and invalid fossil penguin taxa - to the distinct humerus of the new species Ameghino had thought he described. Tongue-in-cheek, Simpson (1972) dedicated the new binomen to Brodkorb. Acosta Hospitaleche (2005) considered the humerus to be assignable to Paraptenodytes robustus; Bertelli et al. (2006) disagree, but believe that it belongs into a different genus.

References

Further reading 
 Acosta Hospitaleche, Carolina (2005): Systematic revision of Arthrodytes Ameghino, 1905 (Aves, Spheniscidae) and its assignment to the Paraptenodytinae. Neues Jahrbuch für Geologie und Paläontologie, Monatshefte 2005(7): 404–414.
 Bertelli, Sara; Giannini, Norberto P.; Ksepka, Daniel T. (2006): Redescription and Phylogenetic Position of the Early Miocene Penguin Paraptenodytes antarcticus from Patagonia. American Museum Novitates 3525: 1-36. DOI: 10.1206/0003-0082(2006)3525[1:RAPPOT]2.0.CO;2 PDF fulltext
 Brodkorb, Pierce (1963): Catalogue of fossil birds. Part 1 (Archaeopterygiformes through Ardeiformes). Bull. Florida State Mus. 7: 179–293. PDF fulltext
 Simpson, George Gaylord (1946): Fossil penguins. Bull. Am. Mus. Nat. Hist. 87: 7-99. PDF fulltext
 Simpson, George Gaylord (1972): Conspectus of Patagonian fossil penguins. American Museum Novitates 2488: 1-37. PDF fulltext

Paraptenodytes
Extinct penguins
Miocene birds of South America
Friasian
Santacrucian
Colhuehuapian
Deseadan
Neogene Argentina
Fossils of Argentina
Fossil taxa described in 1972
Taxa named by George Gaylord Simpson